A Swing Bike is a brand of bicycle which allowed for steering at both the front wheel and the rear wheel. The design was patented by Ralph Belden in 1974, brought to market in 1975, and discontinued by 1978. The name swing bike (common noun) has been genericized to come to mean any bike with a second steering axis in front of the saddle. A new bicycle by the same name has been launched by Americas Bike Co. in San Diego, California.

The original Swing Bike was in the wheelie bike style, and the Swing Bike company also offered a normally-steered BMX bike in 1977. An early working name for the Swing Bike as Pivicycle.

See also
 Outline of cycling
 Sideways bike

References

Bicycles